Jai Parkash Dalal is an Indian politician. He was elected to the Haryana Legislative Assembly from Loharu in the 2019 Haryana Legislative Assembly election as a member of the Bharatiya Janata Party. He has joined BJP in 2014, and served many positions in party such as State Vice President, Incharge of BJP Kisan Cell, Jind District Incharge.

References 

1956 births
Living people
Bharatiya Janata Party politicians from Haryana
People from Fatehabad district
Haryana MLAs 2019–2024